Xavi Sabaté (born 15 August 1976) is a Spanish handball coach of Wisła Płock and the Czech Republic. 

He coached Hungary at the 2017 World Men's Handball Championship.

References

Spanish handball coaches
Handball coaches of international teams
Living people
Spanish expatriate sportspeople in Hungary
Sportspeople from Barcelona
1976 births
Spanish expatriate sportspeople in the Czech Republic
Spanish expatriate sportspeople in Poland